Corbin is an unincorporated community in Livingston Parish, Louisiana, United States.

History
In 1908 the Illinois Central Railroad built a line connecting Hammond to Baton Rouge. At that time a man named Robert A. Corbin owned the majority of the land in the area and the railroad named the depot after him. The Corbin railroad depot was the only stop where water was available for trains traveling between Hammond and Baton Rouge. Then in 1964 local citizens used the Lawrason Act to incorporate into an independent town. Earl Pay Wascom was appointed as the towns first mayor.

References

Unincorporated communities in Livingston Parish, Louisiana
Unincorporated communities in Louisiana